The Social Democratic Party of Serbia (SDPS) is a centre-left political party in Serbia. It is orientated towards social democracy.

History 
In late 2013 SDPS had joined in coalition with the Sandžak Democratic Party, forming a political union. Rasim Ljajić was elected as the SDPS-SDP's first head.

In June 2018 the party was admitted in the Socialist International as observer member. The SDPS currently has seats in the National Assembly. Rasim Ljajić is the current Minister of Foreign and Domestic Trade and Telecommunications since July 2012.

Electoral performance

Parliamentary elections

Presidential elections

References

External links 
Official website

2009 establishments in Serbia
Political parties established in 2009
Pro-European political parties in Serbia
Social democratic parties in Serbia
Centre-left parties in Europe